Álex Serrano may refer to:

 Álex Serrano (footballer) (born 1995), Spanish footballer
 Alex Serrano (baseball) (born 1981), Major League Baseball relief pitcher